MediaGuard is a conditional access system for digital television developed by SECA (Société Européenne de Contrôle d'Accès; renamed to Canal+ Technologies SA) (CEO François Carayol), a subsidiary of Canal+ Group, sold to Thomson (CEO Thierry Breton). Then Canal+ Technologies SA was broken in two pieces by Thomson in 2003, the MediaGuard sold to Nagra France and the MediaHighway to NDS France.

MediaGuard has been on the European market since 1996. It is also used in Middle-East and Asia. MediaGuard is notably used by Canal+.

Manufacturers which incorporate MediaGuard into their equipment are notably Hitachi, Ltd., Humax, JVC, Kenwood Electronics, Nokia, Pace Micro Technology, Philips, Pioneer Corporation, Sagem, Samsung Electronics, Sony Corporation, Strong, Thomson, and Toshiba.

The original MediaGuard system has been broken by the end of the 1990s, allegedly by rival NDS Group, which resulted in new cards being distributed to customers in 2002.

This original version of MediaGuard in the set-top-box is composed of two elements:

 The software running in the box from the technology developed by the company HyperPanel Lab and licensed by Canal+. This technology, called the HyperPanel run has been split into two subsets: MediaHighway and MediaGuard;

 A smart card whose technology was developed by SECA

External links
 The Guardian, March 13th, 2002: How codebreakers cracked the secrets of the smart card
Murdoch firm ordered to hand over documents in TV piracy row
NDS faces probe over TV hacking allegations
NDS said to have paid cash to piracy site - Email 'evidence' links News Corp. to ITV pirates
Details of Canal Plus lawsuit
All Canal+ Lawsuit documents
CANAL+ GROUP FILES LAWSUIT AGAINST NDS TO RECOVER FOR ACTS OF UNFAIR COMPETITION
Canal+ Technologies Press releases
Newspapers - The Guardian / Le Figaro / Les Echos / Le Monde
Murdoch security chief linked to TV piracy site
Murdoch Security Chief Linked to Anti-Competitive Actions
Messier mire for Murdochs
Australian Financial Review article on Canal Plus lawsuit and history of NDS 2019 roku MediaGuar 2 key Negra 3 Seca3 Cryptower Comax Utforzona 2019 roku TV SATELITY klucze

References

Digital television
Conditional-access television broadcasting
Audiovisual introductions in 1996
French inventions